Nanchan Temple or 南禪寺, meaning "Southern Chan Temple" or "Southern Zen Temple", is a common name of Buddhist temples in East Asia.

Nanchan Temple or 南禪寺 may also refer to:

 Nanchan Temple, Wutai, Shanxi, the oldest existing wooden building in China
 , a Buddhist template in Wuxi, China
 Nanchan Temple Station, a station of the Wuxi Metro
 Nanzen-ji, a Buddhist temple in Kyoto, Japan

Buddhist temple disambiguation pages